Common names: Ceylon earth snake, Cuvier's shieldtail, Kerala shieldtail.
Uropeltis ceylanica is a species of nonvenomous shieldtail snake in the family Uropeltidae. The species is endemic to the Western Ghats of South India. No subspecies are currently recognized as being valid, but the presence of several synonyms, many recently resurrected, calls for further taxonomic studies of this species complex. It is a burrowing snake with a pointy head equipped to penetrate the soil. It has a thick tail which looks as if it has been cut at an angle. In Kerala it's called iru thala moori, which means two headed organism, as the tail end looks like another head.  It primarily eats earth worms.

Geographic range
U. ceylanica is found in the Western Ghats of southern India from Goa, Castle Rock southwards to Travancore (Agasthyamalai) near Trivandrum. The type locality given as "Ceylan"— is a mistake, since this species has never been found in Sri Lanka.

Description
The dorsum of U. ceylanica is brown or blackish brown; sometimes patterned with spots or streaks. The venter is yellowish; some specimens have dark brown spots or are entirely brown. The ventral side of the tail is brown or black in the middle, and yellow on the sides.

The dorsal scales are arranged in 17 rows at midbody (in 19 rows behind the head). The ventrals number 120-146; the subcaudals number 8-12.

The snout is rounded. The rostral is one-fourth the length of the shielded part of the head. Portions of the rostral are visible from above and shorter than its distance from the frontal. Nasals are in contact with each other behind the rostral. The frontal is slightly longer than it is broad. The diameter of the eyes is more than half the length of the ocular shield. The total length of the snake is 21 to 29 times the diameter of the body. The ventrals are twice as large as the contiguous scales. The end of tail is flat dorsally, obliquely truncated, with strongly keeled scales which are bi-, tri-, or quadricarinate. It has a terminal scute with a transverse ridge and two points.

References

Further reading

Beddome, R.H. (1863). "Descriptions of New Species of the Family Uropeltidæ from Southern India, with Notes on other little-known Species". Proceedings of the Zoological Society of London 1863: 225–229 + Plates XXV–XXVII.
Beddome, R.H. (1863). "Further Notes upon the Snakes of the Madras Presidency; with some Descriptions of New Species". Madras Quarterly Journal of Medical Science 6: 41–48. [Reprint: (1940). J. Soc. Bibliogr. Nat. Sci., London 1 (10): 306–314].
Beddome, R.H. (1864). "Descriptions of New Species of the Family Uropeltidæ from Southern India, with Notes on other little-known Species". Annals and Magazine of Natural  History, Third Series 13: 177–180.
Beddome, R.H. (1886). "An Account of the Earth-Snakes of the Peninsula of India and Ceylon". Ann. Mag. Nat. Hist., Fifth Series 17: 3–33.
Cocteau, J.T. (1833). "Sur le genre de reptiles ophidiens nommé Uropeltis par Cuvier, et description d'une espèce de ce genre". Magasin de Zoologie Guérin, Paris, Class. III, seven unnumbered pages + Plate 2. (in French).
Cuvier, [G]. (1829). Le Règne Animal Distribué, d'après son organisation, pour servir de base a l'histoire naturelle des animaux et d'introduction a l'anatomie comparée. Nouvelle édition, revue et augmentée. Tome II. Paris: Déterville. xv + 406 pp. (Uropeltis ceylanicus, new species, p. 76). (in French).
Ganesh, S.R.; Aengals, R.; Ramanujam, E. (2014). "Taxonomic reassessment of two Indian shieldtail snakes in the Uropeltis ceylanicus species group (Reptilia: Uropeltidae)". Journal of Threatened Taxa 6; (1): 5305–5314.
Gower, D.J.; Captain, A.; Thakur, S.S. (2008). "On the taxonomic status of Uropeltis bicatenata (GÜNTHER) (Reptilia: Serpentes: Uropeltidae)". Hamadryad 33 (1): 64–82.
 Gray, J.E. (1858). "On a new Genus and several New Species of Uropeltidæ, in the Collection of the British Museum". Ann. Mag. Nat. Hist., Third Series'' 2''': 376–381.

External links

 

Uropeltidae
Reptiles of India
Endemic fauna of India
Reptiles described in 1829
Taxa named by Georges Cuvier